Samuel Paynter (August 24, 1768 – October 2, 1845) was an American merchant and politician from Drawbridge, in Broadkill Hundred, Sussex County, Delaware. He was a member of the Federalist Party, who served in the Delaware General Assembly and as Governor of Delaware.

Early life and family
Paynter was born at Drawbridge in Broadkill Hundred, Sussex County, Delaware, son of Samuel and Meritta Hazzard Paynter. His ancestor, Richard Paynter came to Lewes, Delaware before 1700, and his grandfather, Samuel Paynter, bought land in Broadkill Hundred in 1732. Samuel, our subject, married Elizabeth Rowland in 1796 and they had six children, Mary, Elizabeth, Sally, Samuel Rowland, John Parker, and Alfred Shockley. They were members of St. Peter's Episcopal Church in Lewes.

Professional and political career
Drawbridge, as its name suggests, was the point at which land traffic crossed the Broadkill River, about halfway from Milton to the Delaware Bay. It is where State Route 1 crosses the Broadkill River today. Paynter's father, another Samuel, established a general store there. The business was quite successful, and made the family wealthy enough for Samuel Jr. to be a director of the Farmer's Bank at Georgetown for 25 years.

Paynter was a member of the Federalist Party like the majority in Sussex County. While elsewhere the Federalists were declining as an effective political force, in lower Delaware they organized themselves well, and were far more acceptable to the agrarian, Anglican and Methodist establishment, than the Irish Presbyterians who dominated the majority Democratic-Republican Party in very different New Castle County. Statewide elections were competitive, but the three counties were similar in population, and so the Federalists almost always won, both in the General Assembly and governorship.

Paynter was, therefore, in the majority in his long years of experience in the Delaware General Assembly. Elected first in 1796, he served in the state house for four sessions from 1797 through 1800. He was then elected to the state senate in 1806 and served in seven sessions from 1807 through 1813. Finally, he served in the state senate again in the 1823 session. Defeating his neighbor from Milton, David Hazzard, the Democratic-Republican candidate, Paynter was elected Governor of Delaware in 1823 and served from January 20, 1824 until January 16, 1827. During his tenure as governor construction finally began on the new Chesapeake and Delaware Canal. After his term ended he returned to his home and mercantile business at Drawbridge.

Death and legacy
Paynter died at Drawbridge in Broadkill Hundred, Sussex County, and is buried in the St. Peter's Episcopal Churchyard at Lewes. His son, Samuel R. Paynter, also served in the Delaware General Assembly.

Almanac
Elections were held the first Tuesday of October. Members of the Delaware General Assembly took office the first Tuesday of January. State senators had a three-year term and state representatives had a one-year term. The governor takes office the third Tuesday of January and had a three-year term.

References

Images
Hall of Governors Portrait Gallery Portrait courtesy of Historical and Cultural Affairs, Dover.

External links
Biographical Directory of the Governors of the United States
Delaware’s Governors

The Political Graveyard

1768 births
1845 deaths
18th-century American Episcopalians
19th-century American Episcopalians
People from Lewes, Delaware
Delaware Federalists
Members of the Delaware House of Representatives
Delaware state senators
Governors of Delaware
Burials in Sussex County, Delaware
Federalist Party state governors of the United States